Cycas changjiangensis is a plant species in the cycad order, Cycadales. It is endemic to Hainan Island of southern China. It is found only in a small area in Bawangling 霸王岭国家森林公园, Changjiang County, western Hainan Province, China.

Leaflets are in 40–70 pairs, with prominent midveins on both surfaces.

This is an endangered species with perhaps 2000 individuals remaining in the wild.

References

changjiangensis
Endemic flora of China
Flora of Hainan
Plants described in 1839